Gahniacarus is a genus of flat mites in the family Tenuipalpidae, containing the following species:

 Gahniacarus gersonus Beard & Ochoa, 2011
 Gahniacarus tuberculatus Beard & Ochoa, 2011

References

External links

Trombidiformes genera